Ephraim II may refer to:

 Ephraim of Pereyaslavl, Metropolitan of Kiev and All-Rus' in 1091–1097
 Ephraim II of Georgia, Catholicos-Patriarch of All Georgia in 1960–1972